Fort Vijf Sinnen (also Vyf Sinnen, Dutch for "the five senses") was a fortification made by the Dutch East India Company in Nagapattinam, then part of Dutch Coromandel (1610-1798), now Tamil Nadu. The fortification, also described as a castle, was built to protect the interests of the trading company, which shifted the capital of the Coromandel operation from Pulicat to Nagapattinam in 1690, three years after work began on the fort.

The heavily armed fort in the end proved useless in the 1781 Siege of Negapatam, in which the British took the fort. In the Treaty of Paris of 1784 which ended the Fourth Anglo-Dutch War of which this siege was part, Nagapattinam was not restored to Dutch rule, but remained British. The headquarters of the colony shifted back to Pulicat.

References

External links

Coromandel on De VOC site
Profiles of the fort walls

Archaeological monuments in Tamil Nadu
Vijf Sinnen
Buildings and structures in Nagapattinam district
Dutch Coromandel